The U23 Women's points race was one of the 8 women's under-23 events at the 2009 European Track Championships, held in Minsk, Belarus. It took place on 18 July 2009. 22 participated in the race.

Ellen van Dijk, who won the European title in 2008 and was still under-23, did not defend her title.

Final results

DNF = did not finishSources

See also

2009 European Track Championships – U23 Women's scratch

References

European Track Championships – U23 Women's points race
2009 European Track Championships